The 5th South Indian International Movie Awards is an awards event held at Suntec Convention Centre, Singapore on 30 June and 1 July 2016. SIIMA 2016 will recognize the best films and performances from the past year, along with special honors for lifetime contributions and a few special awards.

Honorary awards

Lifetime Achievement Award 
 S. Janaki (singer)
 Panchu Arunachalam (writer & producer)

Special appreciation 
 TBA

Main awards Nominees

Film

Acting

Debut awards

Music

Critics' choice
Tamil Cinema
Best Actor – Jayam Ravi – Thani Oruvan
Best Actress – Nithya Menen – O Kadhal Kanmani
Telugu Cinema
Best Actor – Allu Arjun – Rudhramadevi
Best Actress – Anushka Shetty – Rudhramadevi
Kannada Cinema
Best Actor – Sathish Ninasam – Rocket
Best Actress – Shanvi Srivastava – Masterpiece
Malayalam Cinema
Best Actor – Nivin Pauly – Premam
Best Actress – Parvathy – Ennu Ninte Moideen

Generation Next Awards 

 The South Sensation of the Year: Sudheer Babu
 The Youth Icon of South India award: Samantha Ruth Prabhu

References

External links
 Official website

South Indian International Movie Awards
2016 Indian film awards